The Schuyler sisters can refer to:

 historical Schuyler sisters of the prominent American Schuyler family:
 Angelica Schuyler Church (1756–1814), American socialite
 Elizabeth Schuyler Hamilton (1757–1854), American socialite and philanthropist, wife of Alexander Hamilton
 Peggy Schuyler (1758–1801), American socialite
 "The Schuyler Sisters", a song from the musical Hamilton

Sibling trios